Ashkan Nikeghbali Cisakht (born  1975) is a  mathematician and university professor . He holds the chair of Financial Mathematics at the University of Zurich.

Academic career 
Nikeghbali obtained his PhD at the Pierre and Marie Curie University in 2005 with the thesis "Temps aléatoires, filtrations et sous-martingales: quelques développements récents", supervised by Marc Yor. Prior to that, he was a researcher from February 2004 to July 2004 at the Isaac Newton Institute on the topic of "Random matrix approaches in number theory." After completing his PhD, Nikeghbali first worked as a postdoctoral researcher at the American Institute of Mathematics (under the direction of Brian Conrey) at Rochester University. In June 2006, he was appointed Heinz-Hopf Lecturer at ETH Zurich. In March 2007, Nikeghbali was appointed assistant professor at the Institute of Mathematics at the University of Zurich. He was promoted to Extraordinary Professor of Applied Mathematics there in 2009.

Research 
Nikeghbali's research focuses on financial mathematics, probability theory, and analytic number theory. In particular, he works in the areas of portfolio theory, stochastic processes, random operators and matrices, and the application of stochastics in number theory and combinatorics.

In asymptotic probability theory, Nikeghbali, together with Féray, Méliot, and Kowalski introduced the concept of Mod-Ф convergence. In number theory, he, together with Chhaibi and Najnudel, introduced the concept of stochastic zeta function.

Nikeghbali supervised at least six PhD students during his time at the University of Zurich.

Other activities   
Member of the world.minds community since 2008. Member of the Scientific Advisory Board of swissQuant. Member of the advisory board of EVMTech. Strategy advisor for data analysis and modeling of stochastic processes at Roche Holding in Basel.

Awards   
Honorary doctorate from the University of Alba Iulia in Romania.

Publications

References

External links 
 

1975 births
21st-century mathematicians
Probability theorists
Number theorists
Pierre and Marie Curie University alumni
People associated with the University of Zurich
Living people